was a Japanese politician and five-time member of the House of Representatives of Japan. He served in government from 1962 when he joined the Ministry of Construction to 2012. At the time of his death, he was the Minister of State for Financial Services.

He was first elected to the House of Representatives in 1993, and was re-elected to four consecutive terms. However, when he failed to support postal privatization, the leaders of his party, the Liberal Democratic Party, refused to support his 2005 campaign. As a result, he dropped out of the race. He returned to run again in 2009, this time as a member of a smaller group, the recently founded People's New Party. He won his election, and for the rest of his life was one of only three members of his party to hold a seat in the House.

Early life and education 
Matsushita was born on 9 February 1939 in Satsumasendai, Kagoshima. He graduated from the Faculty of Agriculture at Kyoto University in March 1962.

Political career 
Matsushita first held a post within the Japanese government in April 1962 when he joined the Ministry of Construction. In June 1970, he seconded with the Ministry of Foreign Affairs. He officially left the Ministry of Construction in June 1992. In 2001, he was appointed Senior Vice Minister of the Cabinet Office, House Committee on Cabinet in 2004. He was the Senior Vice-Minister of Economy, Trade and Industry.

He was the first representative from the Yukio Hatoyama to visit Indonesia, where he guaranteed aid to the country in the wake of the 2009 Sumatra earthquakes. During the 2010 World Future Energy Summit, Matsushita once again represented the Japanese government internationally. He was appointed Minister of Financial Services in June 2012.

House of Representatives 
Matsushita was first elected to the House of Representatives of Japan in July 1993, and was subsequently elected in October 1996, June 2000, November 2003, and 2009. In the House, he served on directed numerous committees, including the Committee on Agriculture, Forestry and Fisheries, Special Committee on Disasters, Committee on Rules and Administration, and Special Committee on Okinawa and Northern Problems. He was also Parliamentary Secretary of the Ministry of Agriculture, Forestry and Fisheries.

Matsushita was a member of the Liberal Democratic Party for four of his five terms. However, during the 2005 elections, he faced opposition from his party after he failed to support postal privatization. He returned to run in 2009, having left his party for the People's New Party. He was a junior member of the party, and one of only four members elected to the House.

Death 
Matsushita was found dead in his residence in Tokyo on 10 September 2012. Police stated that he appeared to have committed suicide by hanging himself.

References 

1939 births
2012 deaths
Government ministers of Japan
Japanese politicians who committed suicide
Kyoto University alumni
Liberal Democratic Party (Japan) politicians
Members of the House of Representatives (Japan)
Noda cabinet
Politicians from Kagoshima Prefecture
People's New Party politicians
Suicides by hanging in Japan
21st-century Japanese politicians